Ernő Gottesmann (19 December 1907 in Arad – 20 December 2004 in Budapest) Hungarian production manager and film producer.

Biography 
He was the son of Ernő Gottesmann and Paula Manoilovich. He attended high school in Budapest, and after graduation, he became a student at Budapest University of Technology and Economics, at the Faculty of Mechanical Engineering. After completing 4 semesters, he left the university, and started working at a German firm called Telefunken, later on he also worked at Magyar Általános Hitelbank, and at Sport Tours. From 1938 he worked at Magyar Filmiroda as a production manager. His most famous films were The Relative of His Excellency, along with Dr. Kovács István and The devil never sleeps (Az ördög nem alszik).

Filmography (as a production manager) 
 A kegyelmes úr rokona (1941)
 Az ördög nem alszik (1941)
 Három csengő (1941)
 Dr. Kovács István (1942)
 Éjfélre kiderül (1942)
 Szakítani nehéz dolog (1942)
 5-ös számú őrház (1942)
 Kölcsönadott élet (1943)
 Legény a gáton (1943)
 Féltékenység (1943)
 Házassággal kezdődik (1943)
 Lejtőn (1944)
 A látszat csal (1944)
 Makkhetes (1944)

References

Sources 
 
 
 Magyar filmlexikon. edited by József Veress. Bp., Magyar Nemzeti Filmarchivum, 2005., 322. p.
 

1907 births
2004 deaths
People from Arad, Romania
Hungarian film producers